The Cupa României Final was the final match of the 2011–12 Cupa României, played between Rapid București and Dinamo București. The match was played on 23 May 2012 at the Arena Națională in Bucharest. Dinamo won the match 1–0, triumphing for the 13th time in this competition while Rapid lost its 6th final.

It was the first final played on the new Arena Națională and the first in Bucharest since 2006. Adrian Scarlatache scored the only goal of the match in the 58th minute while Djakaridja Koné was named Man of the Match. Winners Dinamo faced Romanian Champions CFR Cluj, on the same stadium on 17 July in the Romanian Supercup.

Route to the final

Match

References

External links
 Official site 

2012
Cupa
2012
2012